Henan Songshan Longmen Football Club, previously known as Henan Jianye Football Club, is a professional football club that currently participates in the Chinese Super League under licence from the Chinese Football Association (CFA). The team is based in Zhengzhou, in the province of Henan and their home stadium is the Zhengzhou Hanghai Stadium that has a seating capacity of 29,860. Their owners are the Jianye Residential Group (China) Co., Ltd., which is part of the Central China Real Estate Limited. Their name refers to Jianye, a former name of the ancient city of Jiankang.

The club's predecessor was the Henan Provincial Team who were founded in 1958 while the current professional football team was established on August 27, 1994. The club have never won the league title and the highest position they have ever achieved was when they came third in the 2009 Chinese Super League season.

History
The football club were originally known as Henan Provincial team and was founded in 1958 by the local government sports body to take part in the 1959 Chinese National Games before joining the gradually expanding Chinese football league system. The team often spent much of its time in the second tier except for a short period during the late 1970s when the league was expanded to accommodate more teams. When the Chinese football league system grew to accommodate a third tier Henan found themselves in it when they were relegated from the second tier in the 1981 league season, however they were able to quickly return to the second tier when they came top of the table to win promotion in the 1982 league season. It wasn't long until they won promotion to the top tier once more in the 1985 league season where they would remain until the 1988 league season when they were relegated at the end of the season.

By the 1994 league season the entire Chinese football league system had become professional and Henan would quickly follow when they became professional on August 27, 1994 by selling a 40% stake of the club to Jianye Residential Group (China) Co., Ltd. and renaming themselves Henan Construction. Henan's transition toward professionalism was difficult and they were once more relegated at the end of the 1994 league season to the third tier. Once again they would have to win promotion from the third tier when they came runners-up in the table at the 1995 league season. For several season they were a second tier club fighting against relegation until Henan Jianye Real Estate Development Co., Ltd. decided to take full control of the club on January 15, 1999. With this sure financial footing the club would go on to win the division title and establish themselves back into the second tier.

The club won promotion to the Chinese Super League at the end of the 2006 league season after winning the division title. In their debut season in the top tier playing professional football Henan brought in Pei Encai to add experience to their management and to help them avoid relegation, which he achieved when they finished the season in 12th position, narrowly avoiding relegation after defeating Changchun Yatai 3–2. While he helped them avoid relegation, Henan demanded results in the 2008 league season and this saw them go through several managers before they settled with Tang Yaodong to help them avoid relegation once more. His appointment ended up extremely successful, and throughout the 2009 league season he would lead them to a third-place finish, which is the highest league position they have ever achieved.

The third-place finish led to the club's first and only appearance in the AFC Champions League in 2010, after they changed their English name to Henan Jianye while its Chinese name remained the same. Henan finished the championship with 3 draws and 3 losses in the group stage, and from then on, the club's performance dropped from year to year. In 2011, they finished the season in 13th position. After an even more chaotic and unsatisfying season in 2012, the club was relegated to the second division.

Henan appointed Tang Yaodong again in 2013, who helped the team return to the Chinese Super League after the season. However, Tang was dismissed once again halfway through the 2014 season due to the team's disastrous performance. Jia Xiuquan took the position. The team fought hard against Beijing Guoan in the last game of the season. This goalless game helped the club stay in the Chinese Super League by a narrow one point margin.

Name history
1958–1994 Henan 河南
1994–2009 Henan Construction 河南建业
2010–2020 Henan Jianye 河南建业
2021– Henan Songshan Longmen 河南嵩山龙门

Current squad

First team

Reserve squad
As of 1 March 2019

On loan

Coaching staff

Managerial history
Managers who have coached the club and team since Henan became a fully professional club back on August 27, 1994.

 Zhang Changhai (Aug 1994 – Dec 1994)
 Wang Suisheng (Dec 1994 – Aug 1998)
 Ding Sanshi (Aug 1998 – June 1999)
 Wang Suisheng (Jun 1999 – July 2001)
 Miloš Hrstić (Jul 2001 – Aug 2002)
 Chi Shangbin (Jan 1, 2003  Dec 31, 2003)
 Yin Lihua (Oct 2004 – Sep 2005)
 Chen Wenjie (interim) (Sep 2005 – Nov 2005)
 Meng Wenfeng (Nov 2005 – Sep 2007)
 Pei Encai (Sep 25, 2007 – Dec 20, 2007)
 Jia Xiuquan (Dec 20, 2007 – Jun 2008)
 Acácio Casimiro (Jun 2008 – Sep 15, 2008)
 Tang Yaodong (Sep 15, 2008 – Nov 12, 2010)
 Kim Hak-bum (Nov 12, 2010 – May 23, 2011)
 Zhao Wei (interim) (May 1, 2011 – Jun 30, 2011)
 Jo Bonfrère (Jun 30, 2011 – Dec 31, 2011)
 Jan Versleijen (Jan 1, 2012 – Jul 15, 2012)
 Shen Xiangfu (interim) (Jul 16, 2012 – Nov 30, 2012)
 Tang Yaodong (Nov 30, 2012 – May 28, 2014)
 Jia Xiuquan (Jun 3, 2014 –Jun 3, 2017)
 Yasen Petrov (Jun 13, 2017 –Sep 30, 2017)
 Guo Guangqi (Sep 30, 2017 – Dec 18, 2017)
 Dragan Talajić (Dec 18, 2017 – Apr 21, 2018)
 Chang Woe-ryong (Apr 26, 2018 – Sep 27, 2018)
 Wang Baoshan (Sep 27, 2018 – Jul 6, 2020)
 Yang Ji (interim) (Jul 6, 2020 – Sep 11, 2020)
 Javier Pereira (Sep 11, 2020 – Oct 6, 2021)
 Antonio Carreño (Oct 7, 2021 – Jan 9, 2022)
 Javier Pereira (Jan 9, 2022 – Mar 1 2023)
 Sergio Zarco Díaz (Mar 7, 2023 – )

Honours
All-time honours list including semi-professional Henan Provincial team period.

League

Chinese Jia B League/Chinese League One (Second Tier League)
Winners (3): 1989, 2006, 2013
Chinese Yi League/Chinese League Two (Third Tier League)
Winners (2): 1982, 1999

Youth Team

U-19 team
 U-19 FA Cup Winners: 2007

U-17 Team
 U-17 FA Cup Winners: 2006, 2007

Results
All-time League Rankings

As of the end of 2019 season.

no league game in 1966–72, 1975; 
no Division 2 league game in 1961–63;
 In final group.  In group stage.  No promotion.

Key
<div>

 Pld = Played
 W = Games won
 D = Games drawn
 L = Games lost
 F = Goals for
 A = Goals against
 Pts = Points
 Pos = Final position

 DNQ = Did not qualify
 DNE = Did not enter
 NH = Not Held
 – = Does Not Exist
 R1 = Round 1
 R2 = Round 2
 R3 = Round 3
 R4 = Round 4

 F = Final
 SF = Semi-finals
 QF = Quarter-finals
 R16 = Round of 16
 Group = Group stage
 GS2 = Second Group stage
 QR1 = First Qualifying Round
 QR2 = Second Qualifying Round
 QR3 = Third Qualifying Round

International results
As of 22 February 2017

Key
 (H) = Home
 (A) = Away

References

External links
Official website of Henan Jianye 

 
Chinese Super League clubs
Sport in Zhengzhou
Association football clubs established in 1994
1994 establishments in China